Justice Lord may refer to:

Otis Lord (1812–1884), associate justice of the Massachusetts Supreme Judicial Court
William Paine Lord (1838–1911), associate justice of the Oregon Supreme Court

See also
Justice Lords, the DC Comics supervillain group
Lord Justice (disambiguation)